Johan Per Harju (born 15 May 1986) is a Swedish professional ice hockey forward who is currently playing with HC Pustertal Wölfe of the ICE Hockey League (ICEHL). He was selected by the Tampa Bay Lightning in the 6th round (167th overall) of the 2007 NHL Entry Draft.

Playing career
On 8 April 2009 Harju left Helsingin Jokerit of the KHL and signed as a free agent with HC Dynamo Moscow of the Kontinental Hockey League (KHL).

On 6 April 2010 the Tampa Bay Lightning signed Harju to a one-year, entry-level contract. He scored his first NHL goal on 7 December 2010 against Miikka Kiprusoff of the Calgary Flames. Following the conclusion of the 2010–11 season, Harju returned to play for Luleå HF.

Career statistics

Regular season and playoffs

International

References

External links

1986 births
Brynäs IF players
HC Dynamo Moscow players
HC Dynamo Pardubice players
Jokerit players
Living people
Luleå HF players
Mikkelin Jukurit players
Modo Hockey players
Norfolk Admirals players
People from Övertorneå Municipality
HC Pustertal Wölfe players
Swedish ice hockey centres
Swedish people of Finnish descent
Tampa Bay Lightning draft picks
Tampa Bay Lightning players
Sportspeople from Norrbotten County
Swedish expatriate ice hockey players in the United States
Swedish expatriate ice hockey players in Finland
Swedish expatriate sportspeople in the Czech Republic
Swedish expatriate sportspeople in Russia
Swedish expatriate sportspeople in Italy
Expatriate ice hockey players in the Czech Republic
Expatriate ice hockey players in Russia
Expatriate ice hockey players in Italy